Eurasia or Eurasian may refer to:
Eurasia, landmass containing the traditional continents of Europe and Asia
Eurasian Plate, a tectonic plate
Eurasian Steppe, an ecoregion
Eurasian nomads
Eurasian (mixed ancestry), people descended from European and Asian ancestors
Eurasians in Singapore
Eurasia (Nineteen Eighty-Four), a fictional superstate or country in Orwell's novel
Eurasian Union, an economic union of post-Soviet states.
Eurasianism, a geopolitical doctrine espoused by Zyuganov, Dugin and Primakov amongst others
Eurasia (documentary), a 2004 history documentary series jointly developed by NHK and Point du Jour International
Eurasia (train), a name of electric multiple unit ESh2 (Stadler KISS)

Buildings:
Eurasia (building), a skyscraper in Moscow, Russia
Eurasia Shopping Mall, a shopping mall located in Changchun, China
Eurasia Tunnel, road tunnel in Istanbul, Turkey, crossing underneath the Bosphorus strait

Organisations:
Eurasia Group, a global political risk consultancy
[[Eurasia Foundation]], a Japanese based non-profit
[[Eurasia Foundation]], a U.S. based non-profit
Eurasia Heritage Foundation, a Russian think tank and NGO
Eurasia Aviation Corporation, a former Chinese airline